Gérard C. Louis-Dreyfus (21 June 1932 – 16 September 2016), also known as William, was a French-American businessman. His net worth was estimated at $3.4 billion by Forbes in 2006. He was the chairman of Louis Dreyfus Energy Services and the great grandson of Léopold Louis-Dreyfus, founder of Louis Dreyfus Group. He was the father of actress Julia Louis-Dreyfus.

Life and career 
Louis-Dreyfus was born in Paris in 1932. His great-grandfather Léopold Louis-Dreyfus founded the Louis Dreyfus Group in 1851. His mother, Dolores Porges (née Neubauer; 1905–1987), was American-born, the daughter of a Brazilian father and a Mexican mother. His father, Pierre Louis-Dreyfus, (1908–2011), was a Frenchman who headed the Louis Dreyfus group. His father, who was Jewish, fought in the French Resistance during World War II; his mother was Catholic. He has one sister, Dominique Cornwell. In 1940, Louis-Dreyfus moved to the United States with his mother after her divorce from Pierre. By 1945, he had adopted the name William as a symbol of his integration into American society.

After graduating from Duke University and Duke University School of Law, Louis-Dreyfus worked at the law firm of Dewey Ballantine, New York, before joining Louis Dreyfus in 1965.

Louis-Dreyfus was chairman of the Poetry Society of America from 1998 to 2008. He had poems published in publications such as The Hudson Review. Louis-Dreyfus died at his home in Mount Kisco, New York on 16 September 2016 at the age of 84. His daughter Julia dedicated her 2016 Emmy win to her late father.

Politics 
In October 2012, Dreyfus published a full page ad in The New York Times titled "A Call To Arms To The Wealthy To Protect The Right To Vote" encouraging wealthy people in the United States to fight voter suppression. Dreyfus himself donated $1 million.

Personal life 
Louis-Dreyfus was married twice. In 1955, he married Judith LeFever; they had one daughter, actress Julia Louis-Dreyfus (born January 1961) before divorcing in 1962.
In 1965, he married Phyllis Blankenship; they had two daughters, both social workers: Phoebe Émilie Dominique Louis-Dreyfus Eavis (born May 1968) and Emma R. Louis-Dreyfus (born on 16 June 1974; died on 13 August 2018). In 1996, Phoebe married English financial journalist Peter Eavis at St. Matthew's Episcopal Church in Bedford, New York. He also had a son, Raphael Penteado.

One cousin is Jean Louis-Dreyfus, grandson of the family business founder, Léopold Louis-Dreyfus. Another cousin is Robert Louis-Dreyfus, the former chief executive officer of Adidas and ex-Chairman of French football club Olympique de Marseille.

See also 
 List of billionaires

References 

1932 births
2016 deaths
American billionaires
American investors
American people of French-Jewish descent
Duke University School of Law alumni
French billionaires
French emigrants to the United States
Gerard Louis-Dreyfus
20th-century French Jews
Duke University alumni